Davor Čop (born 31 October 1958) is a Croatian retired football player and current head of Val's football academy.

Managerial career
Čop took charge of Jadran Kaštel Sućurac in June 2012 and he was appointed manager of Zagora Unešić in October 2013, after leading Zmaj Blato.

Personal life
His son Duje is a professional football player and also plays as a forward.

Honours
Hajduk Split
1 time Yugoslav First League Champion: 1978–79
2 times Yugoslav Cup winner: 1977 and 1984
Dinamo Vinkovci
1 time Yugoslav First League top-scorer: 1985–86 with 22 goals

References

External links
 
 His career in list of Yugoslav players and coaches in Italy in RSSSF.
 Stats from Yugoslav Leagues until 1991 in Zerodic.

1958 births
Living people
Footballers from Rijeka
Association football forwards
Yugoslav footballers
Croatian footballers
HNK Hajduk Split players
FK Napredak Kruševac players
HNK Cibalia players
Empoli F.C. players
Yugoslav First League players
Serie A players
Croatian Football League players
Yugoslav expatriate footballers
Expatriate footballers in Italy
Yugoslav expatriate sportspeople in Italy
Croatian football managers
HNK Cibalia managers
HNK Trogir managers
NK Solin managers